The Aura is a river in Molde Municipality in Møre og Romsdal county, Norway. It starts from Lake Aursjøen in the Romsdalsalpane mountains and flows first to the west and then north-west through the village of Eikesdalen before finally emptying into the large lake Eikesdalsvatnet.

In the 1950s, both the main river and most tributaries were transferred to the Aura power plant in Sunndal Municipality.

See also
List of rivers in Norway

References

Molde
Rivers of Møre og Romsdal
Rivers of Norway